The shooting competition at the 2018 Central American and Caribbean Games was held in Barranquilla, Colombia from 22 to 31 July and were held at the Club de Tiro Deportivo.

Medal summary

Men's events

Women's events

Mixed events

Medal table

References

External links
Central American and Caribbean Games – Shooting

2018 Central American and Caribbean Games events
Central American and Caribbean Games
2018
Qualification tournaments for the 2019 Pan American Games